Papaipema birdi, the umbellifer borer,  is a species of moth of the family Noctuidae. It is found from Quebec to Alberta and south in the east to New Jersey.

The wingspan is about 32 mm. The forewings are dull yellowish-brown. The basal spots are cream-colored and there is a large and elongate reniform patch. The hindwings are pale yellowish-brown or cream with darker veins and a diffuse indistinct band in the outer half. Adults are on wing from August to October.

The larvae feed on Cicuta maculata, Angelica atropurpurea, and Sium suave. They bore in the stems of their host plant.

References

Moths described in 1908
Papaipema
Moths of North America